R.ef was a boyband trio in South Korea.  Their main genres were K-pop and hip-hop.

History
In 1995, 21-year-old singer Lee Sung Wook (이성욱), 25-year-old rapper Park Chul Woo (박철우) and 21-year-old singer Sung Dae Hyun (성대현) formed R.ef as a trio.

The group's first album was released in 1995 and contained singles including Farewell Formula, Heartbreak and Silent Scream.

Then the trio released their second album in 1996, titled Back to the Black.  The separately-released singled on the album include Luminous Love and Walking Into Your Heart.

Later in 1996, their third album, Memories in Fall, was released.

In 1998, R.ef moved away from rave music and began to produce hip-hop music. To reflect their change of genre, the group was renamed from R.ef (Rave effect) to REF (Ruff Eazy Flava).

The group disbanded in 1999 but briefly re-formed to release a single on August 13, 2004, called Love is Hard. The group planned to release a fourth album in 2015 after their almost 17-year hiatus but no releases have been made as of January 2017.

Albums
Rave Effect (March 1995)
Back to the Black (April 1996)
Memories in Fall (October 1996)
Ruff Eazy Flava (September 1997)
R.ef: Forever (December 1998)
R.ef: The Last (April 1999)

Single
Love is Hard (2004)

Awards

References

South Korean electronic music groups
Techno music groups
K-pop music groups